T8 was a sea-going torpedo boat that was operated by the Royal Yugoslav Navy between 1921 and 1941, after spending World War I in Austro-Hungarian Navy service. Originally 97F, she was a 250t-class torpedo boat, which saw active service during World War I, performing convoy, patrol, escort and minesweeping tasks, and anti-submarine operations. Following Austria-Hungary's defeat in 1918, 97 F was allocated to the Navy of the Kingdom of Serbs, Croats and Slovenes, which later became the Royal Yugoslav Navy, and was renamed T8. At the time, she and the seven other 250t-class boats were the only modern sea-going vessels of the fledgling maritime force.

During the interwar period, T8 and the rest of the navy were involved in training exercises and cruises to friendly ports, but activity was limited by reduced naval budgets. The ship was captured by the Italians during the German-led Axis invasion of Yugoslavia in April 1941. After her main armament was modernised, she served with the Royal Italian Navy under her Yugoslav designation, conducting coastal and second-line escort duties in the Adriatic. Following the Italian capitulation in September 1943, she was sunk by German aircraft while evacuating Italian troops from Dalmatia.

Background
In 1910, the Austria-Hungary Naval Technical Committee initiated the design and development of a  coastal torpedo boat, specifying that it should be capable of sustaining  for 10 hours. This specification was based on an expectation that the Strait of Otranto, where the Adriatic Sea meets the Ionian Sea, would be blockaded by hostile forces during a future conflict. In such circumstances, there would be a need for a torpedo boat that could sail from the Austro-Hungarian Navy base at the Bocche di Cattaro (Bay of Kotor) to the Strait during the night, locate and attack blockading ships and return to port before morning. After the first contract for eight 250t-class torpedo boats was signed, another tender was requested for four more boats, but when Ganz & Danubius reduced their price by ten percent, a total of sixteen boats were ordered from them, designated the F-group. The F-group designation signified the location of Ganz & Danubius' main shipyard at Fiume. 97 F was the sixteenth and last boat of the F-group to be completed.

Description and construction
The crew consisted of 38–41 officers and enlisted men. The boats were powered by two AEG-Curtiss steam turbines driving two propellers, using steam generated by two Yarrow water-tube boilers, one of which burned fuel oil and the other coal. The F-group had two funnels rather than the single funnel of the preceding T-group. Due to inadequate funding, 97 F and the rest of the 250t class were essentially coastal vessels, despite the original intention that they would be used for "high seas" operations. They were the first small Austro-Hungarian Navy boats to use turbines, and this contributed to ongoing problems with them.

The boats were armed with two Škoda  L/30 guns, and four  torpedo tubes. They could also carry 10–12 naval mines. 97 F was laid down on 5 March 1915, launched on 20 August 1916 and completed on 22 December 1916.

Career

World War I and the interwar period

During World War I, 97 F was used for convoy, patrol, escort and minesweeping tasks, and anti-submarine operations. In 1917, one of her 66 mm guns was placed on an anti-aircraft mount. 97 F survived the war intact. 

In 1920, under the terms of the previous year's Treaty of Saint-Germain-en-Laye by which rump Austria officially ended World War I, she was allocated to the Kingdom of Serbs, Croats and Slovenes (KSCS, later Yugoslavia). Along with three other 250t-class F-group boats, 87 F, 93 F, and 96 F, and four 250t-class T-group boats, she was transferred in March 1921 to the Navy of the KSCS, which later became the Royal Yugoslav Navy (KJRM). Renamed T8 in KJRM service, she and the other seven 250t-class boats were, at the outset, the only modern sea-going vessels in the KJRM. In 1925, exercises were conducted off the Dalmatian coast, involving the majority of the navy. It is not clear if T8 was one of the torpedo boats involved. The ships and crews made a very good impression on the Royal Navy while visiting Malta. In 1932, the British naval attaché reported that Yugoslav ships engaged in few exercises, manoeuvres or gunnery training due to reduced budgets.

World War II
In April 1941, Yugoslavia was drawn into World War II when it was invaded by the German-led Axis powers. At the time of the invasion, T8 was assigned to the 3rd Torpedo Division located at Šibenik, which included her three F-group sisters. On 8 April, the four boats of the 3rd Torpedo Division, along with other vessels, were tasked to support an attack on the Italian enclave of Zara (Zadar) on the Dalmatian coast. They were subjected to three Italian air attacks and, after the last one, sailed from the area of Zaton into Lake Prokljan, where they remained until 11 April. On 12 April, the 3rd Torpedo Division arrived at Milna on the island of Brač, and refused to follow orders to sail to the Bay of Kotor. All four F-group boats were captured by the Italians.

T8 was then operated by the Italians under her Yugoslav designation, conducting coastal and second-line escort duties in the Adriatic. Her guns were replaced by two  L/40 anti-aircraft guns, but no other significant alterations were made to her.

See also
List of ships of the Royal Yugoslav Navy

Notes

Footnotes

References

 
 
 
 
 
 
 
 
 
 
 
 
 

Ships built in Fiume
Torpedo boats of the Austro-Hungarian Navy
World War I torpedo boats of Austria-Hungary
Naval ships of Yugoslavia captured by Italy during World War II
1916 ships
Torpedo boats of the Royal Yugoslav Navy
Maritime incidents in September 1943
Shipwrecks in the Adriatic Sea
Ships sunk by German aircraft
Torpedo boats sunk by aircraft